Hot and sour is a flavor combination in some Asian cuisines, especially Chinese cuisine. Notable examples include:

 Hot and sour noodles
 Hot and sour soup
 Hot and sour wontons

Chinese cuisine
Flavors